USS Verdin (ASR-17) – projected as a Chanticleer-class submarine rescue vessel – was to be built at Savannah, Georgia, by the Savannah Machine & Foundry Co.; but, because of Japan's collapse, the contract for her construction was cancelled on 5 August 1945.

References

 

Chanticleer-class submarine rescue ships
Cancelled ships of the United States Navy